The 1924 Syracuse Orangemen football team represented Syracuse University during the 1924 NCAA football season. The head coach was Chick Meehan, coaching his fifth season with the Orangemen. The team played their home games at Archbold Stadium in Syracuse, New York.

Schedule

References

Syracuse
Syracuse Orange football seasons
Syracuse Orangemen football